Arthrobacter liuii is a gram-positive, aerobic and non-motile bacterium species from the genus Arthrobacter which has been isolated from desert soil from Xinjiang, China.

References

External links
Type strain of Arthrobacter liuii at BacDive -  the Bacterial Diversity Metadatabase

Bacteria described in 2015
Micrococcaceae